This is a list of the municipalities in the province of Burgos in the autonomous community of Castile-Leon, Spain. There are 371 municipalities, the province in Spain with the most divided municipalities rather than other provinces.

See also

Geography of Spain
List of municipalities of Spain

 
Burgos